Daniel MacKinnon, Mackinnon, or McKinnon may refer to:
Daniel Mackinnon (1791–1836), Scottish soldier
Dan Mackinnon (1903–1983), Australian politician
Daniel McKinnon (ice hockey) (1927–2017), American ice hockey player
Daniel MacKinnon (boxer) (born 1983), New Zealand boxer
Daniel H. MacKinnon (1866–?), lawyer and political figure in Nova Scotia, Canada